The Wingan River is a perennial river with no defined major catchment, located in the East Gippsland region of the Australian state of Victoria.

Course and features
The river descends  over its  course.

The upper reaches of the river is traversed by the Princes Highway.

Etymology
The name of the river is derived from the Aboriginal word wangan, meaning "reed bed".

See also

 List of rivers of Australia

References

External links
 

East Gippsland catchment
Rivers of Gippsland (region)
Croajingolong National Park